Carr–Burdette College was a private women's college located in Sherman, Texas that operated from 1894 to 1929.

Affiliated with the Disciples of Christ, the school was founded in 1894 by Mattie F. (Myers) Carr, wife of preacher Oliver Anderson Carr, after they had both returned from a mission trip to Australia.  Mattie Carr financed the construction of the main building by sale 250 lots at $200 each in Sherman.  The school opened in September of that year and Mattie Carr successfully ran the school until her death in 1908, and Mr. Carr carried on as president until his death in 1913.  The school was then run by the local churches of the Disciples of Christ.  In 1914 Carlton College, itself founded in Fannin County, Texas in 1866, merged into Carr–Burdette College.  By 1929 declining enrollment and troubled finances led the school to close.  Ten years later, in April 1939, the property was sold and the two brick buildings were razed.

See also
 List of current and historical women's universities and colleges

Defunct private universities and colleges in Texas
Universities and colleges affiliated with the Christian Church (Disciples of Christ)
Educational institutions established in 1894
1929 disestablishments in Texas
Education in Grayson County, Texas
1894 establishments in Texas
Educational institutions disestablished in 1929